Uwe Adam Ochsenknecht (born 7 January 1956) is a German actor and singer.

Career

Films Ochsenknecht has starred in include Das Boot (1981), Schtonk! (1992), and the TV miniseries Frank Herbert's Dune (2000).

In the early 1990s, he gained a second foothold in music. He has since released several albums; he is a singer in the band The Screen, while Mick Rogers (Manfred Mann's Earth Band) and Thomas Blug are guitar players. The two ex-musicians of Gary Moore's band Pete Rees (bass) and Graham Walker (drums) are also represented.

Ochsenknecht stars in the television film series Der Bulle und das Landei, playing a police commissioner who was transferred to the rural Eifel area, at irregular intervals since 2009.

Personal life

Ochsenknecht was married to Natascha Ochsenknecht until 2012 and has three children with her: sons Wilson Gonzalez Ochsenknecht (b. 1990) and Jimi Blue Ochsenknecht (b. 1991), who are both actors, and daughter Cheyenne Savannah Ochsenknecht (b. 2000). His oldest son, Rocco Stark, is from an earlier girlfriend.

In July 2017, Ochsenknecht married Kiki Viebrock.

Awards

1999 Bavarian Film Awards, Best Actor

Filmography

References

External links

1956 births
Living people
German male film actors
German male television actors
German male singers
German Film Award winners
20th-century German male actors
21st-century German male actors